Penicillium maclennaniae is an anamorph species of fungus in the genus Penicillium.

References

maclennaniae
Fungi described in 1981